Rhadinothamnus euphemiae, is a slender, small, upright shrub with needle-shaped branchlets thickly covered with silvery scales and tubular greenish-purple tubular flowers throughout the year.  It is endemic to the south coast of Western Australia.

Description
The stamens are smooth and more or less equal to the length of the petals. Flowering occurs sporadically throughout the year.

Taxonomy 
This species was first formally described in 1863 by Ferdinand von Mueller who gave it the name Nematolepis euphemiae and published the description in Fragmenta Phytographiae Australiae. In 1971 Paul G. Wilson changed the name to Rhadinothamnus euphemiae and the name change was published in the journal Nuytsia.

Distribution and habitat
Rhadinothamnus euphemiae grows usually in sandy, rocky hillsides and outcrops from the Eyre Range east to Mount Ragged on the south coast of Western Australia.

References

Zanthoxyloideae
Flora of Western Australia
Taxa named by Ferdinand von Mueller